Prizrenasja Hydro Power Plant Museum is located on the Lumbardh River mouth  from Prizren, Kosovo. It was built in 1929 as the first electric power plant in Kosovo. It supplied the town with electricity for 44 years, until 1 November 1973. On 8 November 1979 it opened as the Electrical Museum of Kosovo, exhibiting many original materials and photographs that reflect the development of the electrical economy in Kosovo.

See also 

 List of monuments in Prizren

References 

Cultural heritage of Kosovo
Museums in Kosovo
Cultural heritage monuments in Prizren District